The Military Reserve Force is a military unit of North Macedonia. It is part of Army of the Republic of Macedonia's Joint Operational Command. The organization was formed from the Territorial Defense units of the Socialist Federative Republic of Yugoslavia.

Mission
Unit of the ARM from a priority reserve designed to defend the sovereignty and integrity of the Republic of North Macedonia
It provides carrying out of attack and defense actions on the entire territory of the Republic of North Macedonia
The 3rd Infantry Brigade personnel is professional and from the reserve

Tasks
Continuation of the planned transformation and restructuring of the brigade and bringing the training close to NATO standards
Training of the brigade commands and units
Recruiting and equipping the brigade with material and technical resources and men

2001 Albanian Unrest  
Karpalak Massacre 10 Reservist were killed and 3 were wounded. Monument war built in their home town of Prilep in 2013.

See also
Army of the Republic of North Macedonia

Gallery

References

Government agencies of North Macedonia